Sarah Dekker (born 8 March 2001) is a Dutch female handball player who plays for German club HSG Bensheim/Auerbach.

She also represented Netherlands in the 2019 Women's U-19 European Handball Championship, were she received silver.

Achievements
Junior European Championship:
Silver Medalist: 2019

References

2001 births
Living people
Dutch female handball players
21st-century Dutch women